Katherine Howe (born 1977) is an American novelist who lives in New England and New York City. She specializes in historical novels which she uses to query ideas about "the contingent nature of reality and belief." Her debut novel was the New York Times Bestseller The Physick Book of Deliverance Dane (2009), related to the Salem witch trials. Its success led to her being a guest on several TV news shows, as well as "Salem: Unmasking The Devil" on the National Geographic Channel.

She has also written The House of Velvet and Glass, Conversion, and The Appearance of Annie Van Sinderen (2015). Her fiction has been translated into more than 20 languages.

Biography
Howe was born and raised in Houston, Texas. Her mother is a longtime curator at the Museum of Fine Arts, Houston. She graduated from the Kinkaid School and earned her undergraduate degree in art history and philosophy at Columbia University. She began writing fiction while doing graduate work; she earned an MA in American and New England Studies at Boston University. She teaches at Cornell University.

In 2016 she was a fellow at the Center for Advanced Study in the Behavioral Sciences at Stanford University, where she was finishing a novel set "among the corsairs of the Gulf Coast that imagines Texas’s role within the broader Caribbean diaspora. It is tentatively titled The Galvez Grand. It will build on archival research about patterns of trade and settlement on Galveston Island in the 1820s while engaging with the legacy of magical realist fiction in the American Southwest and in Mexico."

Howe and her husband, the economic historian Louis Hyman (author of Debtor Nation), are core members of a group informally known as the "Springfield Street Table." This batch of Cambridge-area writers and scholars gather to play poker, while trading barbs and debating culture and ideas.  The bestselling novelist Matthew Pearl, who also started writing fiction as a graduate student in English studies, is a core member of this group. He is sometimes credited with helping to launch Howe's literary career.

Howe's ancestors settled in Essex County, Massachusetts in the 1620s. She is related to both Elizabeth Proctor and Elizabeth Howe, women convicted of being witches during the Salem witch trials. Proctor was spared because she was pregnant at the time of her scheduled execution, and later among prisoners released. Howe was executed.

Bibliography

Fiction

Non Fiction

References

21st-century American novelists
Living people
Writers from Houston
The Kinkaid School alumni
1977 births
Columbia College (New York) alumni
People from Marblehead, Massachusetts
Boston University College of Arts and Sciences alumni
American women novelists
21st-century American women writers
Novelists from Massachusetts
Novelists from Texas